The  superyacht Just J's was launched by Hakvoort Shipyards at its yard in Monnickendam. It was designed by Sinot Exclusive Yacht Design, and the naval architecture was done by Diana Yacht Design. It was the largest yacht built by Hakvoort until the 2019 launch of Scout.

Design 
The hull is built out of steel while the superstructure is made out of aluminium with teak-laid decks. The yacht is classed by Lloyd's Register and registered in the Cayman Islands. It is powered by twin Caterpillar 3512C engines.

Featuring on the sundeck is a 3x2-metre pool forward with a contraflow system. Among other amenities on board are a gym and a cinema room on the bridge deck, as well as a tender and four jetskis that are launched from large gullwing doors on either side of the yacht.

See also
 List of motor yachts by length

References

2015 ships
Motor yachts
Ships built in the Netherlands